The Lone Star Hiking Trail (LSHT) is a 96 mile long hiking trail with an additional 32 miles of loop and crossover trails of footpath-only trails. Connecting public lands of the Sam Houston National Forest and private lands it is the longest continuous hiking trail in the State of Texas.  The trail starts just South of Richards, Texas and ends North-West of Cleveland, Texas.

The LSHT was conceived by the Lone Star Chapter of the Sierra Club in 1966. The U.S. Forest Service (USFS) approved construction of the trail and flagging began in 1967, with the first 30 miles constructed in 1968.  The Sierra Club, Boy Scouts of America, and many others were responsible for flagging and construction of the LSHT.  The entire LSHT was completed and turned over to the USFS in 1972.  An extension to the LSHT was approved later and completed in 1978.

The trail is marked with two-inch by four-inch aluminum markers to guide hikers. The Lone Star Hiking Trail may be hiked year round, but winter and spring are the most popular seasons due to the mild southeast Texas climate. During deer hunting season in November and December, hikers should wear highly visible clothing. Primitive camping is allowed off the trail except during deer hunting season when camping is restricted to designated camps. Usually the trail is not crowded, and hikers may observe a multiple-use managed forest with many ages and kinds of trees, plants and wildlife. Trail visitors may also view rivers, creeks, lakes and streams that meander through and around the Sam Houston National Forest. Off-road vehicles are prohibited. Potable water is available at Double Lake and Stubblefield recreation areas.

Lone Star Hiking Trail consists of three major sections (listed from west to east): 
The 40-mile (64 km) Lake Conroe section begins near the intersection of FS 219 and FM 149 east of  Richards, TX to the Stubblefield Recreation area  at the north end of Lake Conroe. Four connecting loops in this area are all designated as part of the trail. This part of trail passes through the Little Lake Creek Wilderness.
The 60-mile (97 km) Central Area of the trail runs northeast from the Stubblefield Recreation Area, to just north of Huntsville State Park. It runs east through the Four Notch area and then turns south east to the town of Evergreen, TX. An on-road section follows FM 945 south to a trailhead parking lot at S Butch Arthur Road. The Four Notch Loop, a 9.2-mile (14.8 km) section, is in the middle of this 60-mile (97 km) area of trail. 
This 27-mile (43 km) section of the trail has National Recreation Trail status.

References

External links 
Lone Star Hiking Trail Club Volunteer trail maintenance group. Also hosts trail maps and maintains a "thru-hiker's guide" on their website. 
Sam Houston National Forest - USDA Forest Service

 
Hiking trails in Texas
Protected areas of Montgomery County, Texas
Protected areas of San Jacinto County, Texas
Protected areas of Walker County, Texas
Long-distance trails in the United States